Samad (transliteration: Ṣamād, also spelled Smad) is a village in southern Syria, administratively part of the Daraa Governorate, located east of Daraa and immediately southeast of Bosra. Other nearby localities include al-Qurayya to the northeast, Hout to the east and Dhibin to the southeast. According to the Syria Central Bureau of Statistics (CBS), Samad had a population of 3,098 in the 2004 census.

History
An inscription dating back was found in Samad dating back to the Roman era testifying that a "public speaker's rostrum" was built by the local Arab tribe of Daban (Dabanenoi) in the village of Samad.

During the late Mamluk era in the 15th century, Samad was the home of the Samadiyya branch of the Qadiriyya Sufi order founded by a certain Shaykh Salim, a student of Abd al-Qadir al-Gilani (died 1166). Leadership of the Samadiyya order was hereditary and led by Shaykh Salim's descendants from their zawiya (Sufi lodge) in Samad. In 1520 the Samadiyya order's sheikh (religious leader) Muhammad ibn Khalil ibn Ali ibn Isa ibn Ahmad al-Samadi (1505–1541) gained an audience with the Ottoman sultan Selim I and secured imperial support for his order. He also relocated its principal zawiya to the as-Salihiyya suburb of Damascus in 1520 and then erected a new principal zawiya in the Shaghur neighborhood in 1525. The order was named after Samad and maintained its name after the move of its main headquarters to Damascus during the early Ottoman era.

Samad is possibly the place named  Garita al-Janahiyya in the 1596 tax registers, being part of the nahiya (subdistrict) of  Bani Malik as-Sadir in the Qada Hauran. It had an entirely Muslim population consisting of 32 households and 13 bachelors. They paid a fixed tax-rate of 40% on agricultural products, including wheat, barley, summer crops, goats and beehives, in addition to occasional revenues; a total of 11,000 akçe.

In 1838, it  was noted as a ruin, Sumad, situated in "the Nukra [Hauran plain], south of Bosra".

Modern era
As of 1980, Samad was a village with an estimated population 1,500, consisting of eight clans. Between 1925 and at least 1980, the office of shaykh al-balad (village headman) has been filled by members of the al-Shuyukh clan.

References

Bibliography

 

Populated places in Daraa District
Villages in Syria